Nationality words link to articles with information on the nation's poetry or literature (for instance, Irish or France).

Events

Works published
 Robert Davenport, A Crowne for a Conquerour; and Too Late to Call Backe Yesterday
 Henry Glapthorne, Poems

Births
Death years link to the corresponding "[year] in poetry" article:
 March 5 (bapt.) – Charles Sedley (died 1701), English wit, dramatist, poet and statesman
 Guillaume Amfrye de Chaulieu (died 1720), French poet and wit

Deaths
Birth years link to the corresponding "[year] in poetry" article:
 May 21 – Tommaso Campanella (born 1568), Italian philosopher and poet
 August 20 – Martin Opitz (born 1597), German
 October – Elizabeth Cary, Viscountess Falkland (born 1585), English poet, translator and dramatist
 December – Sir Henry Wotton (born 1568), English diplomat, author and poet
 Possible date – John Ford (born 1586), English playwright and poet

See also

 Poetry
 17th century in poetry
 17th century in literature

Notes

17th-century poetry
Poetry